Agnez-lès-Duisans is a commune in the Pas-de-Calais department in northern France.

Geography
A farming village located 4 miles (6 km) west of Arras, at the D62 and D56 road junction.

Population

Sights

 The church of St.Martin, dating from the fifteenth century.
 The remains of an old castle.
 Two 18th century farm buildings.

See also
Communes of the Pas-de-Calais department

References

Communes of Pas-de-Calais